Courtney Taylor (born April 7, 1984) is a former American football wide receiver. He was drafted by the Seattle Seahawks in the sixth round of the 2007 NFL Draft. He played college football at Auburn.

Early years
Taylor attended Carrollton High School in Carrollton, Alabama where lettered in football as a quarterback and cornerback.

College career
Taylor played college football at Auburn where he was converted to wide receiver. He has the former school record for career receptions, right after Ryan Davis, with 153.

Professional career

Seattle Seahawks
Taylor was drafted by the Seattle Seahawks in the sixth round of the 2007 NFL Draft. He signed a four-year contract with the team on July 10, 2007. He made his NFL debut on September 16 and caught one pass for six yards. He became the Seahawks' starting wide receiver in 2008 to begin the season, but was demoted in week 4. He was released on October 8, and re-signed to the practice squad. After being re-signed in the offseason, Taylor was waived on September 5, 2009, during final cuts.

BC Lions
On October 12, 2011, Taylor signed a practice roster agreement with the BC Lions. In his first year in the CFL Taylor collected 264 receiving yards and 2 TDs. On May 24, 2013, Taylor agreed to a contract extension.

Personal life
Taylor was diagnosed with multiple sclerosis during the 2008 offseason.

References

External links
Auburn Tigers bio
Seattle Seahawks bio
BC Lions bio

1984 births
Living people
People from Carrollton, Alabama
Players of American football from Alabama
American football wide receivers
Canadian football wide receivers
American players of Canadian football
Auburn Tigers football players
BC Lions players
Seattle Seahawks players
People with multiple sclerosis